"Good engineering practice" or "GEP" is engineering and technical activities that ensure that a company manufactures products of the required quality as expected (e.g., by the relevant regulatory authorities). Good engineering practices are to ensure that the development and/or manufacturing effort consistently generates deliverables that support the requirements for qualification or validation. Good engineering practices are applied to all industries that require engineering.

See also
 GxP
 Good manufacturing practice (GMP)
 Best practice
 American National Standards Institute (ANSI)
 Institute of Electrical and Electronics Engineers (IEEE)
 European Medicines Agency (EMEA)
 Food and Drug Administration (FDA)
 Ministry of Health, Labour and Welfare (Japan)
 Pharmaceutical Inspection Convention and Pharmaceutical Inspection Co-operation Scheme (PIC/S)

Sources
 Risk-Based Qualification for the 21st Century
 ISPE GAMP COP

Good
Engineering concepts
Good practice